The 1st annual installment of NFL Honors was an awards show presented by the National Football League to salute the best players and plays from the 2011 NFL season. The event was held at the Murat Theatre in Indianapolis, Indiana on February 4, 2012 and was hosted by Alec Baldwin. The show aired on NBC and recorded a 2.2 rating with 3.524 million viewers.

List of award winners

Gallery
The following is a gallery of the winners of the awards at the NFL Honors

References

External links
 NFL Honors website

NFL Honors 001
2011 National Football League season
2012 sports awards
2012 in American football
IUPUI Indiana
2010s in Indianapolis
American football in Indiana
Sports in Indianapolis